Emil Anders Larsson (born 11 March 1979) is a Swedish film director and film producer. He produced and directed the Swedish movie Fjorton suger.

References

External links

Swedish film directors
1979 births
Living people